The Harry S. Truman Little White House in Key West, Florida was the winter White House for President Harry S. Truman for 175 days during 11 visits.  The house is located in the Truman Annex neighborhood of Old Town, Key West.

History 

The house was originally waterfront when it was built in 1890 as the first officer's quarters on the U.S. naval station.  The house was designed in 1889 by Scott, McDermott & Higgs, a local architectural firm.  The wooden duplex contained Quarters A for the base commandant and Quarters B for the paymaster.

In 1911, the building was converted into a single-family dwelling to house the base commandant, and additional land was filled in front of the house.  The waterfront view was eventually blocked by a new building at the station.

The first President to visit the site was William Howard Taft in December 1912.  He arrived by Flagler's Overseas Railroad and stayed in Key West before sailing to Panama to inspect the canal then under construction.  During World War I, Thomas Edison resided in the house while donating his service to the war effort.  He perfected 41 underwater weapons during his six-month stay.  The house remained command headquarters through World War II.

Truman's use 

In November 1946, President Harry S. Truman had finished 19 months in office, but was physically exhausted.  His doctor, Wallace Graham, ordered a warm vacation. Truman arrived in November 1946.  As he was leaving, he promised to return whenever he felt the need for rest.  His second vacation came in March 1947.  This set the pattern for additional visits every November–December and every February–March.  Changing technology allowed the President to communicate with multiple political or world leaders at one time and he could summon staff to Key West for a meeting in three hours' flight from Washington.  Most importantly, Truman realized that where the President was, the White House was.  Documents issued from the Little White House read "The White House, US Naval Station, Key West, Florida."  Truman spent 175 days of his presidency at the Little White House.

In 1948, James Forrestal met with the Joint Chiefs of Staff to hammer out the creation of the Department of Defense.  This was called the Key West Agreement, named after the place where the basic outline for the document was agreed to at a meeting that took place from March 11 to March 14 on the base at Key West.

During the Truman visits, Cabinet members and foreign officials were regular visitors for fishing trips and poker games.  Truman visited Key West shortly after his 1948 re-election and Division Street was renamed Truman Avenue in his honor.

After Truman left office, he returned to Key West several times and stayed at various other places.

Post-Truman government use 

In 1948–1949 General Dwight D. Eisenhower held a series of meetings that resulted in the creation of the Department of Defense.  He returned in December 1955 and January 1956 as President to recuperate from a heart attack.

President John F. Kennedy and British Prime Minister Harold Macmillan held a one-day summit here in March 1961.  President Kennedy made a second visit in 1962 immediately following the Cuban Missile Crisis.

The house served as the Naval Station’s commanding officer’s quarters until March 1974, when the submarine base was closed due to the Navy's conversion from diesel to nuclear submarines.  On February 12 of that year, it was added to the U.S. National Register of Historic Places.

Conversion into a museum 

On January 1, 1987, it was deeded to the State of Florida and is held in trust as a public museum.  In 1990 almost a million dollars was spent restoring the house to its 1949 appearance.  A 501(c)(3) organization is attempting to further the restoration and hold education conferences each Spring on Truman's impact upon today's society.

In 1991, the house opened as a state historic site & museum.  Today regular guided tours take visitors through the site, and one can enter the rooms where the Trumans lived, worked and relaxed.  Items such as President Truman's briefcase, books, telephone, and his famous "The Buck Stops Here" sign are still at his desk.  (The reverse of the sign says, "I'm From Missouri.")

Former President Jimmy Carter and his family had a reunion here in 1996.  In April 2001, Secretary of State Colin Powell opened a week of OSCE peace talks, led by Minsk Group Co-Chairman Carey Cavanaugh between President Robert Kocharyan of Armenia and Heydar Aliyev of Azerbaijan.

In January 2005, former President Bill Clinton and his wife, then Senator Hillary Clinton, spent a weekend relaxing at the house.

See also

 List of residences of presidents of the United States

References

External links

 
Truman Little White House official site
National Park Service - Harry Truman's Little White House
Monroe County listings at National Register of Historic Places
Florida's Office of Cultural and Historical Programs
Monroe County listings
Monroe County markers
Little White House
Great Floridians of Key West

Houses completed in 1890
Monuments and memorials to Harry S. Truman
History of Key West, Florida
Houses in Key West, Florida
Museums in Key West, Florida
Landmarks in Key West, Florida
Presidential homes in the United States
National Register of Historic Places in Key West, Florida
Buildings of the United States Navy
Tourist attractions in Key West, Florida
Historic house museums in Florida
Military and war museums in Florida
History museums in Florida
1890s architecture in the United States
Truman family residences
1890 establishments in Florida